= Yoav Blum =

Israeli author and screenwriter (born 1978)

- Born: September 1, 1978 (age 48)
- Occupations: Author and Screenwriter
- Writing career
- Period: 2007–present
- Website: yoavblum.co.il

Yoav Blum (born September 1, 1978) is an Israeli author and screenplay writer, with books published in more than 15 languages.

Yoav's breakout book The Coincidence Makers was translated to 11 languages.

== Early career ==
Yoav began his professional life as a software engineer and continued working in tech even after launching his writing career.

== Publications ==
Yoav first published book was a book with short stories in Hebrew, called "Giving her the moon". The book was published independently in 2007. The copies of the book were deliberately left in public spaces, and the readers were asked to handover the books to others, or leave them in other public places when done reading the book.

In 2011, Yoav's first book was published - "The Coincidence Makers". The book was translated to 13 different languages.

In January 2014 his second book was published - "The guide to the coming days". the book was translated into different languages such as Croatian, Hungarian, Korean, Russian and Traditional Chinese but not to English. As of October 2026, an English version will be available for Amazon Kindle on May 2027

On August 2016 Yoav published his third book - "The Unswitchable". The book was published independently and was not translated into English until 2025. it is also translated to Russian.

On May 2021, he published his fourth book "What others think in me". The book was published in Hebrew and Russian. no English version exists as of today.

On September 2023, he published his 5th book "In the blink of an eye" in Hebrew. The books was translated to English on November 2025, and was also translated to Russian the same year.
